Wang Zhongjun, also known as Dennis Wang, (born November 30, 1960) is a Chinese billionaire businessman, film producer and art collector. He and his brother Wang Zhonglei (a.k.a. James Wang) founded the Chinese entertainment company Huayi Brothers.

Career 
He was born in Beijing, into a family in the military.

Wang bought Vincent van Gogh's 1890 painting Still Life, Vase with Daisies and Poppies for $61.8 million in November 2014. In May 2015, Wang bought Pablo Picasso's Femme Au Chignon Dans Un Fauteuil for $29.93 million. In May 2016 Wang bought a letter written by the 11th century Chinese scholar Zeng Gong for ¥ 207 million, setting a new record for a piece of Chinese letter.

Wang was ranked by Forbes as the 309th richest person in China in 2015, with a net worth of $1 billion.

References

Living people
1960 births
Businesspeople from Beijing
Chinese art collectors
Billionaires from Beijing
Chinese film producers
Stony Brook University alumni
Chinese company founders
Manchu people